The Shire of Coorparoo is a former local government area of Queensland, Australia, located in eastern Brisbane.

History
The Bulimba Division was created on 11 November 1879 under the Divisional Boards Act 1879 with a population of 2007.
On 24 October 1888, the western portion of Bulimba Division was redesignated as the Shire of Coorparoo.

On 1 October 1925, the shire was amalgamated into the City of Brisbane.

Chairmen
The chairmen of Cooparoo Shire were:
 1888-1889: Frederick Thomas Brentnall (also a Member of the Queensland Legislative Council)
 1890:
 1891: George Valentine Hellicar
 1892-1894: Walter Henry Barnes (also a Member of the Queensland Legislative Assembly for Bulimba and Wynnum)
 1895: A. McCorkindale
 1896: George Henry Blocksidge
 1897: J. V. Francis
 1898-1899:  Reginald Macdonnell King (also a Member of the Queensland Legislative Assembly for Logan)
 1900: Walter Henry Barnes
 1901: Thomas Rees
 1902: Reginald Macdonnell King
 1903: Sydney Robertson
 1904-1905: Alexander Morrison Kirkland
 1906: Walter Henry Barnes
 1907: Reginald Macdonnell King
 1908: Frank Thomas Edmonds
 1909: Sydney Robertson
 1910: Allan Carswell Wylie
 1911-1913: Reginald Macdonnell King
 1914: John Lackey
 1915: Alexander McKinnon
 1916:
 1917: Allan Carwwell Wylie
 1918: Arthur William Soden
 1919: John Smith Bennett
 1920-1921: J. W. Ewart
 1922: Reginald Macdonnell King
 1923: Walter Henry Barnes
 1924-25: John Innes Brown (also a Member of the Queensland Legislative Assembly for Logan)

References

Further reading 

 

Former local government areas of Queensland
Coorparoo, Queensland
1925 disestablishments in Australia